Push Play is the third independent CD release for singer, songwriter and actress, Sara Niemietz.  Produced by Emmy Award winner, W. G. Snuffy Walden and Sara Niemietz, Push Play is an EP consisting of six original songs.

Description 

Push Play showcases the musical style of Sara Niemietz in collaboration with Emmy Award winning composer-instrumentalist W. G. Snuffy Walden and Grammy Award winning composer-producer Glen Ballard. 

Stephen K. Peeples, announced the release of  Push Play on the June 20, 2012 presentation of SCVNews. SCVTV airs on cable channels 20 and 99 in Santa Clarita, California, Est. population 177,641. AtlasJams interviewed Niemietz about her career, how she met and started working with Walden and announced the EP release in May 2012.

Musicians 

 Glen Ballard, synths
 Aaron Beaumont, piano
 George Doering, guitar, bass
 Randy Kerber, piano
 Herman Matthews, drums
 Sara Niemietz, vocals, piano, guitar
 Bennett Salvay, piano, cello arrangement, conducting
 Andrew Schulman, cello
 W.G. Snuffy Walden, guitar, bowed guitar, piano, synths, backup vocals

Production 
Produced by: W.G. Snuffy Walden and Sara Niemietz

"Dangerous Outside" produced by: Glen Ballard, W.G. Snuffy Walden and Sara Niemietz

 Glen Ballard, programming
 Scott Cambell, engineering ("Dangerous Outside")
 Dave Donnelly, mastering 
 Avi Kipper, engineering ("On Your Way")
 George Landress, engineering
 W.G. Snuffy Walden, programming
 Kiya Wilson, CD design

Track listing

References

External links 
 Sara Niemietz (Listen now)
 W. G. "Snuffy" Walden
 Taylor Made Studios
 

2012 EPs
Sara Niemietz EPs